Kelmarsh is a village and civil parish in West Northamptonshire, England. The population (including Haselbech) of the civil parish at the 2011 Census was 208.

The villages name probably means, 'marsh marked out by poles or posts'. The place-name is identical to Chelmarsh, Shropshire; the initial K- reflects Old Norse influence.

Buildings
Kelmarsh Hall is its principal building.

Kelmarsh Tunnel is a former railway tunnel at Kelmarsh now open as part of the Brampton Valley Way.

References

External links

Villages in Northamptonshire
West Northamptonshire District
Civil parishes in Northamptonshire